Zhang Haoruo (1932 – 27 March 2004) was a politician and petroleum engineer of the People's Republic of China. He served as Governor of Sichuan province and Minister of Internal Trade.

Biography
Zhang Haoruo was born in Jiaozuo, Henan province in 1932. He joined the Chinese revolution in April 1949 and the Communist Party of China in 1950.

References

1932 births
2004 deaths
Governors of Sichuan
Chinese Communist Party politicians from Henan
People's Republic of China politicians from Henan
Engineers from Henan
Government ministers of the People's Republic of China
Politicians from Jiaozuo
Petroleum engineers
Tsinghua University alumni